This is a list of the pierid butterflies of India. It forms part of the full List of butterflies of India.

The family Pieridae, or the whites and yellows are a family of butterflies of moderate or small size. The common names refer to the two predominant colours found on the wings of these butterflies along with markings in black. 

Of the 1051 species of pierids occurring in the world, 81 species in 21 genera are found in India.

Distinguishing features
 Outline of wings usually regular. Hindwings are never tailed.
 Forelegs are fully developed in both sexes.
 The hindwings are channelled at the abdomen to fit the abdomen.

Classification
Worldwide, family Pieridae has four subfamilies, of which the whites and the yellows are well represented in India. 
 Pierinae or the whites
 Coliadinae or the yellows

Subfamily Pierinae, whites

Genus Aporia, blackveins
Tibet blackvein, Aporia peloria Hewitson, 1853
Himalayan blackvein, Aporia leucodice (Eversmann, 1843) 
Dusky blackvein, Aporia nabellica (Boisduval, 1836)
Bhutan blackvein, Aporia harrietae (de Nicéville, 1892) 
Great blackvein, Aporia agathon (Gray, 1832)

Genus Baltia, dwarfs 
Shaw's dwarf, Baltia shawi (Bates, 1873)
Butler's dwarf, Baltia butleri Alphéraky, 1889

Genus Pieris, whites
Chumbi white, Pieris chumbiensis de Nicéville, 1897
Green banded white, Pieris krueperi devta (de Nicéville, 1884)
Greenvein white, Pieris napi Linnaeus, 1767 
Naga white, Pieris naganum Moore, 1884 
Kashmir white, Pieris deota (de Nicéville, 1884)
Large cabbage-white, Pieris brassicae Linnaeus, 1758
Indian cabbage white, Pieris canidia Linnaeus, 1758
Small cabbage white,  Pieris rapae Linnaeus, 1758

Genus Pontia, Bath whites
Lesser Bath white, Pontia chloridice  (Hübner, 1813)
Lofty Bath white, Pontia callidice (Hübner, 1800)
Eastern Bath white, Pontia edusa (Fabricius, 1777)

Genus Anaphaeis, pioneers
 Pioneer (caper white), Anaphaeis aurota Fabricius, 1793

Genus Cepora, gulls
 Common gull, Cepora nerissa Fabricius, 1775
 Lesser gull, Cepora nadina Lucas, 1852

Genus Ixias, Indian orange tips
 White orange tip, Ixias marianne Cramer, 1779
 Yellow orange tip, Ixias pyrene Linnaeus, 1764

Genus Delias, Jezebels
 Yellow Jezebel, Delias agostina Hewitson, 1852
 Common Jezebel, Delias eucharis Drury, 1773
 Painted Jezebel, Delias hyparete Linnaeus, 1758
 Hill Jezebel, Delias belladonna Fabricius, 1793
 Pale Jezebel, Delias sanaca (Moore, 1857)
 Dark Jezebel, Delias berinda (Moore, 1872)
 Redspot Jezebel, Delias descombesi Boisduval, 1836
 Redbase Jezebel, Delias pasithoe Linnaeus, ?
 Redbreast Jezebel, Delias acalis Godart, 1819

Genus Prioneris, sawtooths
 Spotted sawtooth, Prioneris thestylis Doubleday, 1842
 Painted sawtooth, Prioneris sita C. Felder, 1865
 Redspot sawtooth, Prioneris clemanthe Doubleday, 1846

Genus Appias, puffins and albatrosses
 Spot puffin, Appias lalage (Doubleday, 1842)
 Plain puffin, Appias indra Moore, 1857
 Western striped albatross, Appias libythea Fabricius, 1775
 Eastern striped albatross, Appias olferna Fabricius, 1775
 Chocolate albatross, Appias lyncida Cramer, 1777
 Common albatross, Appias albina Felder
 Lesser albatross, Appias wardii (Moore, 1884)
 Orange albatross, Appias nero galba (Wallace, 1867)
 Nicobar albatross, Appias panda chrysea Fruhstorfer, 1903

Genus Leptosia, Psyche 
 Psyche, Leptosia nina Fabricius, 1793

Genus Euchloe, little whites
Lemon white, Euchloe charlonia lucilla Butler, 1886
Pearl white, Euchloe ausonia dephalis Hübner 1803

Genus Hebomoia, great orange tip
 Great orange-tip, Hebomoia glaucippe Linnaeus, 1758

Genus Colotis, Arabs
 Small salmon Arab, Colotis amata Fabricius, 1775
 Blue-spotted Arab, Colotis phisadia (Godart, 1819)
 White Arab, Colotis vestalis (Butler, 1876)
 Large salmon Arab, Colotis fausta (Olivier, 1804)
 Small orange-tip, Colotis etrida Boisduval, 1836
 Plain orange-tip, Colotis aurora (Cramer, 1780)
 Crimson-tip, Colotis danae (Fabricius, 1775)

Genus Pareronia, wanderers
 Pale wanderer, Pareronia avatar (Moore, 1858)
 Dark wanderer, Pareronia ceylanica (C. & R. Felder, 1865)
 Common wanderer, Pareronia valeria (Cramer, 1776)

Subfamily Coliadinae, yellows

Genus Catopsilia, emigrants
 Common emigrant, Catopsilia pomona Fabricius, 1775
 Mottled emigrant, Catopsilia pyranthe Latreille, 1758

Genus Gonepteryx, brimstones
Common brimstone, Gonepteryx rhamni Latreille, 1758
Lesser brimstone, Gonepteryx aspasia Ménétriés, 1859

Genus Dercas, sulphurs
 Tailed sulphur, Dercas verhuelli (Hoeven, 1839)
 Plain sulphur, Dercas lycorias (doubleDay, 1842)

Genus Eurema, grass yellows
 Small grass yellow, Eurema brigitta Cramer, 1780
 Spotless grass yellow, Eurema laeta Boisduval, 1836
 Scarce grass yellow, Eurema lacteola Distant, 1886
 One-spot grass yellow, Eurema andersonii Moore
 Common grass yellow, Eurema hecabe Linnaeus, 1758
 Three-spot grass yellow, Eurema blanda Boisduval, 1836
 Nilgiri grass yellow, Eurema nilgiriensis

Genus Gandaca, tree yellow
Tree yellow, Gandaca harina (Horsfield, 1829)

Genus Colias, clouded yellows
 Lemon clouded yellow, Colias thrasibulus Fabricius, 1910
 Ladakh clouded yellow, Colias ladakensis C. Felder, 1865
 Everest clouded yellow, Colias berylla Fawcett, 1904
 Fawcett's clouded yellow, Colias nina Fawcett, 1904
 Pale clouded yellow, Colias hyale Linnaeus, 1758
 Fiery clouded yellow, Colias eogene C. Felder, 1865
 Orange clouded yellow, Colias stoliczkana Moore
 Dwarf clouded yellow, Colias dubia Elwes, 1906
 Dark clouded yellow, Colias croceus Geoffroy, 1785
 Nilgiri clouded yellow, Colias nilgiriensis

Life cycle
Eggs - Tall, bottle-shaped eggs which are ribbed down the sides. They are generally white, eventually changing to yellow or orange, or, they may be blotched with red. 
Caterpillars - The caterpillars are cylindrical and smooth usually covered with hairy-ended tubercles. They are generally green and have pale longitudinal stripes. They are all generally similar and difficult to distinguish apart.
Chrysalids - Angular with a pointed head which may be produced into a long snout. Supported by a tail hook and girth, some being suspended head upwards like the swallowtails and others being fastened horizontally to a leaf or other surface.

Food plants
The food plants vary considerably, however there is a general trend, in that the whites mostly use capers, (family Capparidaceae) while the yellows usually prefer members of the family Leguminosae, which consist of peas, clover, Cassia and others.

References

External links
 LepIndex, NHM, London
 Idaho Museum of Natural History
 A modern classification of the Pieridae at Butterfly Net International
 Indian Butterflies - Pieridae

Pieridae
India
B